The Philippine Defense Medal is a military award and decoration of the Republic of the Philippines which is awarded to recognize the initial resistance against Japanese invasion between the dates of 8 December 1941 and 15 June 1942. The award was first created in December 1944, and was issued as the Philippine Defense Ribbon. A full-sized medal was authorized and added in July, 1945.

Criteria
The Philippine Defense Medal is presented to any service member, of either the Philippine military or an allied armed force, which participated in the defense of the Philippine Islands between December 8, 1941 and June 15, 1942. Participation in any engagement against the enemy in Philippine territory, in Philippine waters, or in the air over the Philippines or 
over Philippine waters. An individual will be considered as having 
participated in an engagement if they meet one of the following:

(A) Participation in any engagement against the enemy in Philippine territory, in Philippine waters, or in the air over the Philippines or over Philippine waters. An individual will be considered as having participated in an engagement if they meet one of the following.

(1) Was a member of the defense garrison of the Bataan Peninsula or of the fortified islands at the entrance to Manila Bay.

(2) Was a member of and present with a unit actually under enemy fire or air attack.

(3) Served on a ship that was under enemy fire or air attack.

(4) Was a crewmember or passenger in an airplane that was under enemy aerial or ground fire.
    
(B) Assigned or stationed in Philippine territory or in Philippine waters for not less than 30 days during the period.
    
(C) Individuals who meet conditions set forth in paragraphs (A) and (B) of this section are authorized to wear a bronze service star on the ribbon.
  
The Philippine Defense Medal was awarded to the United States and Philippine Commonwealth troops which defended the Philippines at Bataan and would later be captured and forced to endure the Bataan Death March.

Recipients
 Ramon A. Alcaraz
 Donald Blackburn
 John D. Bulkeley
 Jose Calugas
 James W. Coe
 Edwin A. Doss
 Richard W. Fellows
 Guy Fort
 Amado F. Gador 
 Noel Gayler
 Harold Keith Johnson
 Edward P. King
 Emilio S. Liwanag
 Douglas MacArthur
 William G. Martin
 George F. Moore
 Emmett O'Donnell Jr.
 Moises Pama
 George M. Parker
 Royal Reynolds, Jr.
 Manuel F. Segura
 Susano Madril
 Edward Thiele
 Jesus M. Vargas
 Walter A. Ditto
 Jonathan M. Wainwright
 Frank D. Wagner
 Charles A. Willoughby

Similar awards
Similar Philippine medals include the Philippine Liberation Medal and the Philippine Independence Medal.  Members of the United States Armed Forces entitled to the Philippine Defense Medal were also eligible to receive the Asiatic-Pacific Campaign Medal with a bronze "battle star" (" service star) for participation in the defense of the Philippines.

See also
 Awards and decorations of the Armed Forces of the Philippines

References

Citations

Bibliography
 The AFP Adjutant General, AFP Awards and Decorations Handbook, 1995, 1997, OTAG.

External links
Philippine Defense Medal : Display Recognition, The American war Library.

Military awards and decorations of the Philippines
Military history of the Philippines during World War II